Ghosts of Mars is a soundtrack by John Carpenter for the film of the same name. It was released in 2001 through Varèse Sarabande.

Track listing

Personnel
Anthrax
 Scott Ian – guitar
 Paul Crook – guitar
 Frank Bello – bass
 Charlie Benante – drums

Stone
 Brad Wilson – guitar
 Brian James – bass
 J.J. Garcia – drums

Additional personnel
 John Carpenter – composition, keyboards
 Steve Vai – guitar
 Buckethead – guitar
 Elliot Easton – guitar
 Robin Finck – guitar
 Bruce Robb – Fender Rhodes electric piano, production, mixing
 Joe Robb – saxophone
 Bucket Baker – percussion
 Robert Townson – executive producer  
 Dee Robb – mixing 
 The Great Tiago Becker – assistant engineer and editing 
 Joseph Bishara – Pro Tools sound design
 Pat Sullivan-Fourstar – mastering 
 Neil Jacobs – photography

References

John Carpenter soundtracks
2001 soundtrack albums
Varèse Sarabande soundtracks
Action film soundtracks
Science fiction film soundtracks
Horror film soundtracks